Michal Važan is a Slovak professional ice hockey player in Slovakia with MHC Martin of the Slovak Extraliga.

References

External links

Living people
MHC Martin players
1983 births
Slovak ice hockey forwards
Sportspeople from Martin, Slovakia
Slovak expatriate sportspeople in Hungary
Slovak expatriate sportspeople in Poland
Expatriate ice hockey players in Hungary
Expatriate ice hockey players in Poland
Slovak expatriate ice hockey players in Germany